Jim Stewart (born 5 January 1994) is a retired Australian Rugby Union player who played for the  in Super Rugby competition. He was also a member of the  team that competed in the National Rugby Championship. His regular playing position is centre.

Jim Stewart represented Australia at schoolboy and under-20 level. He was a regular starter for the under 20s.

References

1994 births
Living people
Australian rugby union players
Rugby union centres
Sydney Stars players
Rugby union players from Sydney
New South Wales Waratahs players